Donja Drenova is a settlement (naselje) in the Sveti Ivan Zelina administrative territory of Zagreb County, Croatia. As of the 2011 census, it had a population of 308 people.

References

Populated places in Zagreb County